Colonel Alan Vincent Gandar Dower (28 March 1898 – 6 May 1980) was a British Army officer and politician. He was Conservative Member of Parliament (MP) for Stockport from 1931 to 1935, and MP for Penrith and Cockermouth from 1935 to 1950.

Dower's brother Eric was also a Conservative MP, while another brother Kenneth was a well-known explorer. All used different versions of their surname: Dower, Gandar Dower and Gandar-Dower respectively.

References

External links 
 

1898 births
1980 deaths
UK MPs 1931–1935
UK MPs 1935–1945
UK MPs 1945–1950
Conservative Party (UK) MPs for English constituencies
Place of birth missing
Queen's Royal Regiment officers
2nd Dragoon Guards (Queen's Bays) officers
Royal Engineers officers
Royal Artillery officers
British Army personnel of World War I
British Army personnel of World War II
Members of the Parliament of the United Kingdom for Stockport